Bill Steinkellner and Cheri Steinkellner are an American husband and wife screenwriting duo, known for their work on Cheers, Teacher's Pet, its film adaptation of the same name, and Bob. They wrote the book of the musical Sister Act, for which they received a Tony Award nomination.

Personal lives
Bill and Cheri have been married since 1982 and together, they have three children: Emma (author/illustrator of the graphic novel The Okay Witch, and illustrator of the graphic novel Quince), Kit (writer of Quince), and Teddy.

Filmography

Unrealized projects
 Toy Story 3

Theater

Awards and nominations

References

External links
 Bill Steinkellner on Internet Movie Database
 Cheri Steinkellner on Internet Movie Database

Living people
1949 births
1955 births
Screenwriters from California
Screenwriting duos
People from Los Angeles
Disney Television Animation people